Rune Jacobsen (born: 28 September 1967 Bergen) is a sailor from Norway, who represented his country at the 1992 Summer Olympics in Barcelona, Spain as helmsman in the Soling. With crew members Erling Landsværk and Thom Haaland they took the 10th place.

Jacobsen is currently managing director and Senior Partner at the Boston Consulting Group and heads the Hong Kong and Shenzhen offices.

References

1967 births
Living people
Norwegian male sailors (sport)
Sailors at the 1992 Summer Olympics – Soling
Olympic sailors of Norway
Sportspeople from Bergen
Management consultants
Management consultants by nationality